Darius "Darjo" Earvin Johnson-Odom (born September 28, 1989) is an American professional basketball player for Rapid București of the Liga Națională. In 2009, he transferred to Marquette University from Hutchinson Community College. As a senior, Johnson-Odom was named first-team All-Big East.

Player profile
Johnson-Odom is listed as a 6'2" tall (1.88 m) and 100 kg (220 lb.) point guard-shooting guard. He was measured at 6'3" tall with shoes on at the 2012 NBA Draft combine.

Professional career
Johnson-Odom spent three seasons at Marquette University before he was selected 55th overall in the 2012 NBA draft by the Dallas Mavericks, who immediately traded him to the Los Angeles Lakers. Johnson-Odom was assigned to the Lakers' D-League team, the Los Angeles D-Fenders, several times during 2012–13 season.

On January 7, 2013, Johnson-Odom was waived by the Lakers. It was the final day for NBA teams to cut players on non-guaranteed contracts before their contracts became guaranteed for the season. He played four games and had just 6 minutes in total for the Lakers, spending most of his time in the D-League where he was the D-Fenders' leading scorer, averaging 21 points per game. During his time with the Lakers, however, Johnson-Odom set the NBA record for most career field goal attempts without scoring a point, shooting 0-of-14 on field goals in his 21 minutes of NBA play.

On January 24, 2013, Johnson-Odom joined Spartak St. Petersburg of Russia for the remainder of the 2012–13 season.

He joined the Boston Celtics for the 2013 Orlando Summer League. On September 25, 2013, he re-signed with the Lakers. However, he was later waived again on October 16. On October 18, 2013, he signed with the Sichuan Blue Whales of China. In November 2013, just four games into the season, he left the Blue Whales.

On January 3, 2014, he was acquired by the Springfield Armor.

On March 14, 2014, he signed a 10-day contract with the Philadelphia 76ers. On March 24, 2014, he was not offered a second 10-day contract after his first 10-day contract expired.

On August 2, 2014, he signed with Pallacanestro Cantù of Italy for the 2014–15 season.

On June 14, 2015, Johnson-Odom signed with Trabzonspor of the Turkey for the 2015–16 season. On December 28, 2015, he left Trabzonspor and signed with Olympiacos Piraeus of Greece for the rest of the season.

On June 11, 2016, Johnson-Odom signed with  Dinamo Sassari of Italy for the 2016–17 season. On February 1, 2017, he left Sassari and signed with Vanoli Cremona for the rest of the season. On September 28, 2017, he re-signed with Cremona.

On September 24, 2018, Johnson-Odom signed with the Minnesota Timberwolves. This came after it was announced that an Italian anti-doping court suspended him for eight months after he tested positive to a THC test on May 6, 2018. On October 13, 2018, he was waived by the Timberwolves. Johnson-Odom was added to the Iowa Wolves opening night roster. Appearing in 49 games, Johnson-Odom led the 2018–19 Wolves in points per game among players of any service time, putting up 22.5 points per game.

On March 25, 2019, he has signed with Reggio Emilia in the Italian Lega Basket Serie A (LBA). On July 25, 2019, he extended his contract with Reggio Emilia for 2 more years.

On July 21, 2020, he has signed with Orléans Loiret Basket of the French Pro A.

On October 26, 2021, he has signed with Le Mans Sarthe of the LNB Pro A.

On July 21, 2022, he has signed with Rapid București of the Liga Națională.

The Basketball Tournament
Johnson-Odom has played in The Basketball Tournament (TBT), a million-dollar winner-take-all annual tournament, as a member of the Golden Eagles, a team mainly consisting of former Marquette players. He first played on the team in TBT 2016 and TBT 2017. He next played in TBT 2020, when the team won the tournament and its $1 million prize. Johnson-Odom was named MVP of the tournament. He averaged 16.8 points, 1.5 assists and 1.0 steals per game and had 15 points in the title game. He returned to the Golden Eagles for TBT 2022.

Career statistics

College

|-
| style="text-align:left;"| 2009–10
| style="text-align:left;"| Marquette
| 34 || 22 || 29.7 || .455 || .474 || .677 || 2.7 || 2.4 || .9 || .2 || 13.0
|-
| style="text-align:left;"| 2010–11
| style="text-align:left;"| Marquette
| 37 || 35 || 30.0 || .433 || .364 || .708 || 3.0 || 2.4 || .8 || .2 || 15.8
|-
| style="text-align:left;"| 2011–12
| style="text-align:left;"| Marquette
| 34 || 33 || 32.9 || .447 || .385 || .764 || 3.5 || 2.7 || .9 || .1 || 18.3
|-
| style="text-align:center;" colspan="2"| Career
| 105 || 90 || 30.8 || .443 || .402 || .722 || 3.1 || 2.5 || .9 || .2 || 15.7

NBA

Regular season

|-
| style="text-align:left;"| 
| style="text-align:left;"| L.A. Lakers
| 4 || 0 || 1.5 || .000 || .000 || .000 || 1.0 || .3 || .0 || .0 || .0
|-
| style="text-align:left;"| 
| style="text-align:left;"| Philadelphia
| 3 || 0 || 5.0 || .000 || .000 || .000 || .7 || .3 || .3 || .0 || .0
|-
| style="text-align:center;" colspan="2"| Career
| 7 || 0 || 3.0 || .000 || .000 || .000 || .9 || .3 || .1 || .0 || .0

NBA D-League

Regular season

|-
| style="text-align:left;"| 2012–13
| style="text-align:left;"| Los Angeles
| 13 || 13 || 39.8 || .440 || .393 || .817 || 5.2 || 5.2 || 1.3 || .2 || 21.0
|-
| style="text-align:left;"| 2013–14
| style="text-align:left;"| Springfield
| 27 || 26 || 35.9 || .453 || .356 || .815 || 4.4 || 6.1 || 1.4 || .2 || 22.0
|-
| style="text-align:center;" colspan="2"| Career
| 40 || 39 || 37.2 || .448 || .369 || .816 || 4.7 || 5.8 || 1.4 || .2 || 21.7

International Leagues

Regular season

|-
| style="text-align:left;"| 2012–13
| style="text-align:left;"| St. Petersburg
| 13 || 4 || 10.3 || .418 || .200 || .692 || .9 || .9 || .3 || .0 || 5.3
|-
| style="text-align:left;"| 2013–14
| style="text-align:left;"| Sichuan
| 5 || 0 || 30.8 || .596 || .556 || .806 || 3.4 || 2.2 || .6 || .2 || 20.4
|-
| style="text-align:center;" colspan="2"| Career
| 18 || 4 || 16.0 || .509 || .294 || .758 || 1.6 || 1.2 || .4 || .1 || 9.5

References

External links
 

NBA.com profile 
Draftexpress.com profile
Euroleague.net profile
FIBA.com profile
Marquette Golden Eagles bio
"The 10 Least Consequential Athletes of the Decade" by Jon Bois, for SB Nation

1989 births
Living people
African-American basketball players
American expatriate basketball people in China
American expatriate basketball people in France
American expatriate basketball people in Greece
American expatriate basketball people in Italy
American expatriate basketball people in Russia
American expatriate basketball people in Turkey
American men's basketball players
Basketball players from Raleigh, North Carolina
BC Spartak Saint Petersburg players
Dallas Mavericks draft picks
Dinamo Sassari players
Hutchinson Blue Dragons men's basketball players
Iowa Wolves players
Le Mans Sarthe Basket players
Lega Basket Serie A players
Los Angeles D-Fenders players
Los Angeles Lakers players
Marquette Golden Eagles men's basketball players
Olympiacos B.C. players
Orléans Loiret Basket players
Pallacanestro Cantù players
Pallacanestro Reggiana players
Philadelphia 76ers players
Shooting guards
Sichuan Blue Whales players
Springfield Armor players
Trabzonspor B.K. players
Vanoli Cremona players